Ted Mack may refer to:

Ted Mack (politician), Edward Mack, Australian politician
Ted Mack (radio and television host), born William Edward Maguiness, American television host

See also
Edward Mack, composer